The Green Monster is the left field wall at Fenway Park in Boston, Massachusetts.

Green Monster may also refer to:

Boston Red Sox
 Wally the Green Monster, mascot
 Green Monster (novel), featuring the Red Sox

Infrastructure nicknames
 Hart Bridge in Jacksonville, Florida
 Central Artery, an elevated section of I-93 freeway in downtown Boston, Massachusetts, before it was rebuilt underground as part of the Big Dig project

Other
 Green Monster (automobile), series of dragsters and land speed record cars built by Art Arfons between 1952 and 1991.
 Green Monster (EP), 2008 release by Suicide Silence
 Green Monster Games, later 38 Studios, now defunct,  video game developers
 Green Monster of Braxton County, or Flatwoods monster, 1952 cryptid

See also
 Green-Eyed Monster (disambiguation)